Åkra may refer to:

Places
Åkra, a former municipality in Rogaland county, Norway
Åkra, or Åkrahamn, a town in Karmøy municipality, Rogaland county, Norway
Åkra, Vestland, a village in Kvinnherad municipality, Vestland county, Norway

Churches
Åkra Church (Rogaland), a church in Karmøy municipality, Rogaland county, Norway
Åkra Church (Vestland), a church in Kvinnherad municipality, Vestland county, Norway
Old Åkra Church, a church in Karmøy municipality, Rogaland county, Norway

See also
Accra, the capital of Ghana
Acra (disambiguation)
Acre (disambiguation)
Akra (disambiguation)
Akre (disambiguation)
Aqra (disambiguation)